This Is My Town: Songs of New York is a studio album by American singer-songwriter Barry Manilow, released on April 21, 2017 by Decca Records and Stiletto Entertainment. The album celebrates Barry Manilow's hometown New York City by "saying thanks to the city for giving me my ambition, my sense of humor and my decency", according to Manilow. It consists both of new original Manilow compositions and standards "evoking the spirit and energy of New York City".

Track listing
All tracks produced by Barry Manilow and co-produced by David Benson; except "Coney Island" co-produced by Michael Lloyd.

Charts

References

2017 albums
Barry Manilow albums